Oracle Agile PLM, formerly Agile Software Corporation, is a product lifecycle management (PLM) software owned by Oracle. Agile Software Corporation was a San Jose, California based company that provided product lifecycle management (PLM) software. After Oracle acquired the company in 2007, it became Oracle Agile PLM. The acquisition also allowed Oracle to expand and rewrite their Oracle Cloud PLM software within the Oracle Cloud SCM suite.

In February, 2005, Agile Software Corporation acquired Cimmetry Systems Corporation, a privately owned software developer specializing in enterprise visualization, for approximately US$41.5 million in cash. Cimmetry Systems Corporation became a wholly owned subsidiary of Agile Software Corporation.

Agile Software Corporation operated as a public company, with shares trading on NASDAQ. On 15 May 2007, Oracle Corporation announced that it would acquire Agile Software Corporation through a cash merger for US$8.10 per share, or approximately US$495 million. On July 16, 2007, Oracle Corporation completed the acquisition of Agile, which became a wholly owned subsidiary.

See also
List of acquisitions by Oracle

External links
 Official website

References

Oracle acquisitions
Product lifecycle management
Defunct software companies of the United States